Firuzeh Rural District is a rural district (dehestan) in the Central District of Firuzeh County, Razavi Khorasan province, Iran. At the 2006 census, its population was 9,292, in 2,322 families.  The rural district has 28 villages.

References 

Rural Districts of Razavi Khorasan Province
Firuzeh County